This is a list of translations of Beowulf, one of the best-known Old English heroic epic poems. Beowulf has been translated many times in verse and in prose. By 2020, the Beowulf's Afterlives Bibliographic Database listed some 688 translations and other versions of the poem, from Thorkelin's 1787 transcription of the text, and in at least 38 languages.

The poet John Dryden's categories of translation have influenced how scholars discuss variation between translations and adaptations. In the Preface to Ovid's Epistles (1680) Dryden proposed three different types of translation:

The works listed below may fall into more than one of Dryden's categories, but works that are essentially direct translations are listed here. Versions of other kinds that take more "latitude" are listed at List of adaptations of Beowulf.

Translations

There are hundreds of translations or near-translations of Beowulf, and more are added each year, so a complete list may well be unattainable. Listed here are the major versions discussed by scholars, along with the first versions in different languages.

References

Sources

 

Translation-related lists